Myx (stylized as MYX or myx) is a Philippine pay TV channel based in Quezon City, owned by Creative Programs Inc., a subsidiary of ABS-CBN Corporation. The channel is targeted to youth audiences and primarily airs music videos.

It was introduced as a programming block on free-to air television through the now-defunct television network Studio 23 in 2000, airing in early morning, afternoon and late evening time slots. A standalone 24-hour pay channel was introduced in 2002, and an international version of the channel was created in 2007. Myx is notable for showing the lyrics as the music video plays which was adapted from video karaoke, a popular pastime in Asia. Since 2006, Myx has given the annual Myx Music Awards to the most influential personalities in the Philippine music industry.

History

Myx was first aired on November 20, 2000 on ABS-CBN's sister television network, Studio 23 (now S+A). It was intended to be the replacement of MTV Philippines. It aired on Studio 23 during daytime hours.

On June 2002, ABS-CBN merged Myx on channel 23 with the then-top-rated music cable channel, VID-OK. The Myx name was retained but with VID-OK's style of playing music videos with lyrics.

On January 16, 2014, Myx stopped airing on Studio 23 when the channel was converted to ABS-CBN Sports and Action (S+A). In 2018, it was added to the ABS-CBN TV Plus digital terrestrial platform on channel 12; ABS-CBN TV Plus shut down in 2020 when the company's broadcasting franchise expired without renewal.

In June 2021, Myx in the Philippines and its international version adopted a common logo, introduced internationally the year before, and merged their digital assets.

In July 2021, as part of the partnership between ABS-CBN Entertainment and TV5/Cignal, Cignal added Myx and its sister channel Cinema One to its channel line-up as a free trial and later as "add-ons" for lower plans.

VJs and hosts

Myx has produced some of the most popular VJs in the country, including Lourd de Veyra, Luis Manzano, Geoff Eigenmann, Heart Evangelista, Nikki Gil, Bernard Palanca, and Iya Villania. Since 2007, Myx has produced the annual Myx VJ Search with the aim of searching the country's best VJs; the finalists will be given the chance to be a VJ on Myx. MYX only has one VJ left—Samm Alvero; the channel previously had more, but after losing the broadcast franchise, the other VJs were laid off as part of corporate retrenchment at ABS-CBN.

Programming

Myx programming consists primarily of themed blocks of music videos and music chart shows, as well as concerts, events, and live performances. In addition, the station airs several additional programs, among them the talk show I Feel U, hosted by Toni Gonzaga, and the talk show We Rise Together, featuring artists from the ABS-CBN-owned Rise Artists Studio. It airs on MYX every Wednesday, Thursday and Friday, 7:00am and 8:00pm.

International

In 2007, Myx TV (originally launched simply as Myx) was launched in the United States. It was later reformatted to become a general-entertainment channel targeted to the Asian-American diaspora. Myx TV is operated independently from its Filipino counterpart with some of its programming produced in the United States by ABS-CBN International and by other third-party production companies.

References

External links

 
Television networks in the Philippines
Music video networks in the Philippines
Television channels and stations established in 2000
Creative Programs
Assets owned by ABS-CBN Corporation
2000 establishments in the Philippines
ABS-CBN Corporation channels